Robert Rochelle (born November 25, 1945) is an American lawyer and former Democratic politician. He served as a member of the Tennessee Senate from 1982 to 2002.

Early life
Robert Rochelle was born on November 25, 1945 in Nashville, Tennessee. He graduated from Middle Tennessee State University with a bachelor of science degree in 1968, and earned a juris doctor from the University of Tennessee College of Law in 1969. Following law school, Rochelle served in the Army during the Vietnam War where he was awarded a bronze star and oak leaf cluster for his service.

Career

Political career
Rochelle served as a Democratic member of the Tennessee Senate from 1982 to 2002. He served as Speaker Pro Tempore for a majority of his time in the State Senate, as well as in several other leadership capacities.

Legal career
Rochelle co-founded the law firm Rochelle, McCulloch & Aulds with Jere McCulloch and Jo Ann Aulds in 1987. By 2016, it was "the largest law firm in Wilson County with 12 attorneys, more than 20 staff members and offices in Lebanon and Mt. Juliet."

Personal life
With his wife Janice, Rochelle has two children. They reside in Lebanon, Tennessee. He is a Methodist.

References

External links

Living people
1945 births
People from Nashville, Tennessee
People from Lebanon, Tennessee
Middle Tennessee State University alumni
University of Tennessee College of Law alumni
Democratic Party Tennessee state senators
Tennessee lawyers